Clostridium acetobutylicum, ATCC 824, is a commercially valuable bacterium sometimes called the "Weizmann Organism", after Jewish Russian-born biochemist Chaim Weizmann. A senior lecturer at the University of Manchester, England, he used them in 1916 as a bio-chemical tool to produce  at the same time,  jointly, acetone, ethanol, and n-butanol from starch. The method has been described since as the ABE process,  (Acetone Butanol Ethanol fermentation process), yielding 3 parts of acetone, 6 of n-butanol, and 1 of ethanol. Acetone was used in the important wartime task of casting cordite. The alcohols were used to produce vehicle fuels and synthetic rubber.

Unlike yeast, which can digest only some sugars into alcohol and carbon dioxide, C. acetobutylicum and other Clostridia can digest whey, sugar, starch, cellulose and perhaps certain types of lignin, yielding  n-butanol, propionic acid, ether, and glycerin.

In genetic engineering
In 2008, a strain of Escherichia coli was genetically engineered to synthesize butanol; the genes were derived from Clostridium acetobutylicum. In 2013, the first microbial production of short-chain alkanes was reported - which is a considerable step toward the production of gasoline. One of the crucial enzymes - a fatty acyl-CoA reductase - came from Clostridium acetobutylicum.

See also
 ABE
 Acetone
 Butanol 
 Clostridium beijerinckii
 Ethanol

References

Further reading

External links
 ATCC reference organism 824 C.Acetobutylicum. 
 findarticles.com: Bacteria speeds drug to tumors - use of Clostridium acetobutylicum enzyme to activate cancer drug CB 1954.
 EPA Clostridium acetobutylicum Final Risk Assessment
 Genetic Engineering of Clostridium acetobutylicum for Enhanced Production of Hydrogen Gas: Penn State University.
 Pathema-Clostridium Resource
 Chaim Weizmann
 Type strain of Clostridium acetobutylicum at BacDive -  the Bacterial Diversity Metadatabase

Biofuels
Gram-positive bacteria
acetobutylicum